Selago nachtigalii is a species of plant in the family Scrophulariaceae. It is endemic to Namibia.  Its natural habitat is cold desert.

References

Endemic flora of Namibia
nachtigalii
Least concern plants
Taxonomy articles created by Polbot